Perth City Hall is an events facility in King Edward Street, Perth, Scotland. It is a Category B listed building. Built in 1914, it closed in 2005 and underwent a major renovation, beginning in 2018, including the introduction of a museum in part of the building. The building is scheduled to reopen as Perth Museum in 2024.

History

In the mid-19th century the administrative centre of the town was the old city chambers at the east end of the High Street. However, civic leaders needed a public hall in which to hold concerts and other public events and the first city hall, designed by William Macdonald Mackenzie, was built on the site of the old flesh, butter and meal markets in what became King Edward Street in 1844. By the turn of the century the first city hall was in a very dilapidated state and, after a piece of plaster fell from the ceiling injuring several people, the building was demolished in 1908.

The foundation stone for the new building was laid by the Lord Provost, Councillor James Cuthbert, on 26 June 1909. It was designed by Harry Edward Clifford and Thomas Melville Lunan in the Classical style, built at a cost of £25,000 and officially opened by the Lord Justice General, Lord Dunedin, on 29 April 1911. The design involved a symmetrical main frontage with five bays facing King Edward Street, which was laid out between 1901 and 1902; the central section of three bays featured a large portico with three round-headed doorways with windows above flanked by full-height Ionic order columns in pairs. Perth mercat cross was erected immediately to the west of City Hall in 1913, during the building's reconstruction.

Margaret Thatcher addressed the Scottish Conservative Party conference in the hall, just a week after becoming Prime Minister, in May 1979. Beyond the mercat cross, the main entrance of St John's Centre was built facing City Hall: the remainder of St John's Place was demolished in 1987 to make way for its construction.

High profile concert performers at City Hall have included Morrissey in September 2004. However, following the opening of the Perth Concert Hall in 2005, the city hall became vacant and was placed on the Buildings at Risk Register for Scotland. In May 2012 Perth and Kinross Council submitted a proposal to demolish the hall and redevelop the site but this was rejected by Historic Scotland. The council then sought architectural proposals for the re-design of the existing building and the short-listed proposals were put on display in June 2017. In January 2019 BAM Construction began work on a £30 million programme of works to convert the city hall into a new heritage and arts attraction based on a design by Mecanoo. The new attraction will incorporate displays on the Stone of Destiny and the Kingdom of Alba.

In December 2020, the Scottish Government announced that the Stone of Destiny would be relocated to the hall by 2024.

A competition to name the building's forthcoming museum section was launched in March 2022, with the winning name being "Perth Museum", with 60% of the votes.

See also
List of listed buildings in Perth, Scotland

Notes

References

External link
"Friends of Perth & Kinross Archive Present: Ancient Roots - creating a new museum at Perth City Hall" – Culture Perth and Kinross, YouTube, 16 May 2022

Perth
Government buildings completed in 1914
1914 establishments in Scotland
Listed buildings in Perth, Scotland
Category B listed buildings in Perth and Kinross
Listed government buildings in Scotland
Listed museum buildings in Scotland